Towen Mountain is a rural locality in the Sunshine Coast Region, Queensland, Australia. In the  Towen Mountain had a population of 289 people.

Geography 
Much of the land is used for rural residential purposes, but some is used for grazing on native vegetation and crop growing.

History 
In the  Towen Mountain had a population of 289 people.

References 

Suburbs of the Sunshine Coast Region
Localities in Queensland